Politotdelskoye is a rural locality (a settlement) in Lisichanskoye Rural Settlement, Olkhovatsky District, Voronezh Oblast, Russia. The population was 172 as of 2010. There are 5 streets.

Geography 
Politotdelskoye is located 22 km northwest of Olkhovatka (the district's administrative centre) by road. Postoyaly is the nearest rural locality.

References 

Rural localities in Olkhovatsky District